Eduardas Rozentalis (born 27 May 1963 in Vilnius) is a Lithuanian chess grandmaster.

He played for the Lithuanian team in every Chess Olympiad since 1992, except in 2000 and 2012. Rozentalis won the Lithuanian Chess Championship in 1981, 1983 (jointly with 	Aloyzas Kveinys) and 2002.

In 1995 he tied for first in the Canadian Open Chess Championship. He also tied for first, with 6/9, in the 2008 staging of this event, in Montreal. At the Rilton Cup 2005/6 in Stockholm he was shared 1st with Normunds Miezis, Sergey Ivanov, Tomi Nybäck and Evgeny Postny. In 2009/10 he tied for 1st-5th with Radosław Wojtaszek, Pavel Ponkratov, Luke McShane and Igor Lysyj at the 39th Rilton Cup in Stockholm. In May 2010, he won the 3rd Magistral Ciudad de Asunción Copa Roggio tournament. In 2012 Rozentalis won the Cultural Village tournament in Wijk aan Zee and qualified for the Grandmaster Group C of the 2013 Tata Steel Chess Tournament; however, he did not take part in the latter event.

In 2019, he won the GM Winter Petach Tikva international tournament with a score of 7.5/9

In 2018, the second edition of his book The Correct Exchange in the Endgame was published.

His mother is Ilana Rozentalienė (b. 1937) who twice won Lithuanian Women's Chess Championship (1962, 1965).

See also
 List of Jewish chess players

References

External links
Eduardas Rozentalis chess games at 365Chess.com

1963 births
Living people
Chess grandmasters
Lithuanian chess players
Lithuanian Jews
Jewish chess players
Chess Olympiad competitors
Sportspeople from Vilnius